Photinia serratifolia (syn. Photinia serrulata), commonly called Taiwanese photinia  or Chinese photinia is a flowering shrub or tree in the flowering plants family Rosaceae, found in mixed forests of China, Taiwan, Japan, the Philippines, Indonesia, and India.

Description 
The tree is evergreen, with white flowers emerging in Spring accompanied by red-colored leaves, and red fruits growing in Autumn. Its leaves are toxic due to the presence of cyanogenic glycosides. The flower, blossoming in spring, typically lasts for one to two weeks. Its flowers are known to have a strong scent similar to that of human semen. The flower have bell-shaped sepal split into five lobes, and around 20 stamens. Ovary contain two to four locules, with one ovule in each locule. The fruit, ripen in Autumn and survives through winter, is a food source to various kinds of birds, including thrushes, waxwings, and starlings. The seeds spread primarily through bird excretions.

Distribution and habitat 
It is found in mixed forests of central and southern China, Taiwan, Japan, the Philippines, Indonesia, and India.

Varieties
Three varieties of the species are recognized in the Flora of China:
 Photinia serratifolia var. ardisiifolia. Narrow leaf variant native to Taiwan, typically found around 850m altitude. Leaves are obovate (reverse ovate), ellipse-shaped, and leathery in texture.
 Photinia serratifolia var. daphniphylloides. Wide leaf variant native to Taiwan. Leaves are elliptic or long obovate.
 Photinia serratifolia var. lasiopetala. Native to Taiwan. Leaves are obovate, slender, or spoon-shaped.

Uses 

The tree is widely used as a greening plant in some mainland Chinese cities, due to the relative ease to plant and maintain, and the tree being less demanding for its surrounding environments. In Wuhan, where the tree is in its native range, the tree is planted by the sides of all major avenues, as well as in the Wuhan University. However, due to the strong, semen-like odor from its flowers filling the entire city in Spring, some Wuhan residents have complained that the tree should be removed and other trees should be planted instead.

References 

serratifolia
Trees of China
Flora of India (region)
Trees of Japan
Trees of Malesia
Trees of Taiwan